Avonhurst is an unincorporated community in Saskatchewan located on the Canadian National Railway line northeast of Regina flourishing in the 1950s. It had grain elevators, a general store and a fuel service operated by Clayton Davis. The community diminished as farms became larger and people moved to major centres.

South Qu'Appelle No. 157, Saskatchewan
Unincorporated communities in Saskatchewan
Division No. 6, Saskatchewan